Margaret Smith (1884–1970) was a British orientalist writing on early Christian and Muslim mysticism, presenting a view from an open-minded Christian perspective.

Biography 
Smith was the first westerner to chronicle the life of the Sufi mystic Rábi'a of Basra, and compiled brief histories of other Sufi teachers and their doctrines, translating Arabic and Persian texts into English.

Smith counted among her mentors Thomas Walker Arnold, Alfred Guillaume, R. A. Nicholson, and Louis Massignon.

Works
In the 1970s four of Smith's works — by then hard to come by — were reprinted in Amsterdam, by the Philo Press in arrangement with The Society for Promoting Christian Knowledge, London.

An Early Mystic of Baghdad: Al-Muhasibi, ca 781-875 A.D. Master of primitive Islamic mysticism and precursor of the great Muslim Mystics, 1935
An Introduction to the History of Mysticism, 1930 
Rabi'a the Mystic and Her Fellow-Saints in Islam. Being the life and teachings of Rabi'a al-'Adawiyya al-Qaysiyya of Basra, Sufi saint, ca A.H. 99-185, A.D.717-801. Together with an account of the place of the women in Islam and with a survey of sources, references, a concise bibliography and indexes, 1928
Studies in Early Mysticism in the Near and Middle East. Being an account of the rise and development of Christian mysticism up to the seventh century, of the subsequent development in Islam, known as Sufism, and of the relationship between Christian and Islamic mysticism. With references, a bibliography and two indexes, 1931.

References

See also
Mysticism
Sufi studies

Christian scholars of Islam
1884 births
1970 deaths

British orientalists